Beauty on a Back Street is the sixth studio album by American pop music duo Hall & Oates. The album was released in September 1977, by RCA Records.

Track listing

Personnel 
 Daryl Hall – lead vocals (1, 2, 3, 6, 7, 8), backing vocals, keyboards, Polymoog synthesizer, guitars, mandolins
 John Oates – lead vocals (4, 5, 9), backing vocals, rhythm guitars, mando-guitar, electric piano (4), dulcimer (4)
 Christopher Bond – backing vocals (2, 3, 4, 8, 9); keyboards, synthesizers, tonalities, lead 6-string and 12-string guitars (8, 9); arrangements, string arrangements and conductor 
 Leland Sklar – bass (1-4, 6-9)
 Jim Hughart – second bass (4)
 Scott Edwards – bass (5)
 Jeff Porcaro – drums, electronic drums
 Gary Coleman – percussion, sound effects
 Tom Scott – tenor saxophone (5, 9)
 Tommy Mottola – backing vocals (3)

Production 
 Produced by Christopher Bond
 Recorded and Engineered by John Mills
 Assistant Engineer – Linda Tyler
 Strings engineered by Armin Steiner
 Recorded and Mixed at Sound Labs (Hollywood, CA).
 Remixed at The Hit Factory (New York, NY).
 Mastered by Greg Calbi at Sterling Sound (New York, NY).
 Art Direction and Design – Dick Smith
 Photography – John Beau
 Production Assistant – Candy Van Duser
 Management and Direction – Tommy Mottola

References

1977 albums
Hall & Oates albums
RCA Records albums